A list of important Slovene historians:

Martin Baučer (1595–1668)
Johann Ludwig Schönleben (1618–1681)
Johann Weikhard von Valvasor (1641–1693)
Marko Hanžič (1683–1766)
Anton Tomaž Linhart (1756–1795)
Urban Jarnik (1784–1844)
Davorin Trstenjak (1817–1890)
Karel Dežman (1821–1889)
Janez Trdina (1830–1905)
Simon Rutar (1851–1903)
Dragotin Lončar (1876–1954)
Bogumil Vošnjak (1882–1955)
Milko Kos (1892–1972)
Alojzij Kuhar (1895–1958)
Lojze Ude (1896–1982)
France Klopčič (1903–1986)
Fran Zwitter (1905–1988)
Bogo Grafenauer (1916–1995)
Sergij Vilfan (1919–1996)
Vasilij Melik (1921–2009)
Janko Pleterski (b. 1923)
Toussaint Hočevar (1927–1987)
Milica Kacin-Wohinz (b. 1930)
Slavko Kremenšek (b. 1931)
Branko Marušič (b. 1938)
Jože Pirjevec (b. 1940)
Janko Prunk (b. 1942)
Jožko Šavli (b. 1943)
Boris M. Gombač (b. 1945)
Alenka Puhar (b. 1945)
Peter Vodopivec (b. 1946)
Tamara Griesser-Pečar (b. 1947)
Janez J. Švajncer (b. 1948)
Jerca Vodušek Starič (b. 1950)
Vasko Simoniti (b. 1951)
Oto Luthar (b. 1959)
Marta Verginella (b. 1960)
Peter Štih (b. 1960)
Mitja Ferenc (b. 1960)
Andrej Studen (1963–2022)
Taja Kramberger (b. 1970)

 
Historian
Slovenia